Domenico Scribonio dei Cerbo was a Roman Catholic prelate who served as Bishop of Imola (1511–1533).

Biography
On 10 Feb 1511, Domenico Scribonio dei Cerbo was appointed during the papacy of Pope Julius II as Bishop of Imola.
He served as Bishop of Imola until his resignation in 1533.
While bishop, he was the principal co-consecrator of Antonio Beccari, Bishop of Shkodrë (1524).

References

External links and additional sources
 (for Chronology of Bishops) 
 (for Chronology of Bishops) 

16th-century Italian Roman Catholic bishops
Bishops appointed by Pope Julius II